2003–04 Croatian First League was the 13th season of the Croatian handball league since its independence and the third season of the First League format.

League table

First phase
In the first part of the season, 16 teams played single-circuit league (15 matches). After 15 rounds the first six teams qualified for the Championship play-offs - playing for the Championship title and the remaining 10 in the Relegation play-offs - playing to stay in the league.

Championship play-offs
Intermediate matches from the first part of the championship were transferred, and the clubs played three more times (15 matches).

Relegation play-offs
Relegation play-offs  determined the placement of clubs that were between 7th and 16th place in the first phase of the championship. 18 matches were played (double league system).

Final standings

Sources
Fredi Kramer, Dražen Pinević: Hrvatski rukomet = Croatian handball, Zagreb, 2009.; str. 180
hrt.hr, ljestvica i rezultati 1. dijela
hrt.hr, rezultati i ljestvice drugog dijela prvenstva

References

2003-04
handball
handball
Croatia